National Highway 330 is a national highway in India that links Allahabad, Uttar Pradesh to Balrampur in Uttar Pradesh. Previously this highway was named NH-96. NH 330 is a 4 Lane highway in UP.

Major Cities and Towns
Route of NH-330 connects below mentioned major cities of U.P.

 Allahabad
 Pratapgarh
 Sultanpur
 Bikapur
 Faizabad
 Ayodhya
 Nawabganj
 Gonda
 Balrampur

Junctions

  Terminal near Allahabad.
  near Pratapgarh.
  near Pratapgarh.
  near Sultanpur.
  near Sultanpur.
  near Ayodhya.
  Ayodhya.
  near Gonda.
  Terminal near Balrampur.

Toll Plaza
 Allahabad
 Ayodhya

See also
 List of National Highways in India by highway number
 National Highways Development Project

References

External links 

 NH 330 on OpenStreetMap

National highways in India
National Highways in Uttar Pradesh
Transport in Allahabad district
Transport in Ayodhya